Vaja Gigashvili ((October 15, 1936 — December 31, 2017) was a Georgian writer and playwright.

Biography 
Gigashvili graduated in 1961 from Georgian Technical University, Faculty of Architecture, Urban Planning and Design. Afterwards, he worked as an architect, published several Georgian stories, novels, and translated stories of Thomas Pynchon. Also he is screenwriter award-winning movie The Legend of Suram Fortress. Some of his works have been translated into English, French and Russian.

His main works are Stories from a Poet Who Seldom Wrote Poems, 2017.

Works

Books
 Stories from a Poet Who Seldom Wrote Poems, Tbilisi, Intelekti Publishing, 2017
 Day and Time 1956-1966, Tbilisi, Intelekti Publishing, 2017
 One Person Kaplanishvili, Tbilisi, Palitra L publishing, 2010
 Warm bed and cold night, Tbilisi, Merani publishing, 2006
 Hunting in Chong-Tash, Tbilisi, Nakaduli publishing, 1976

Literary prizes and awards
 Saguramo literary prize, 2009
 Gold Medal of Pen Club, 2015

References

External links 
 Vaja Gigashvili
 The Legend of Suram Fortress (1985)
 Vaja Gigashvili
 Gigašvili, Važa

Writers from Tbilisi
Male writers from Georgia (country)
1936 births
2017 deaths
Novelists from Georgia (country)
Screenwriters from Georgia (country)
Translators from Georgia (country)
20th-century translators